Marcus Henderson Cruikshank (December 12, 1826 – October 10, 1881) was a Confederate States of America politician who served in the Confederate States Congress during the American Civil War.

Cruikshank was born in Autauga County, Alabama. He later served as the mayor of Talladega, Alabama.  From 1864 to 1865, he was the representative from Alabama's fourth district in the Second Confederate Congress.

Cruikshank's son, George Cruikshank, was a newspaper editor of the Birmingham Chronicle and Birmingham Ledger; he also was appointed as US postmaster in Birmingham, Alabama.

References
 The Political Graveyard

Members of the Confederate House of Representatives from Alabama
19th-century American politicians
People from Autauga County, Alabama
People from Talladega, Alabama
1826 births
1881 deaths
Mayors of places in Alabama